8 Paoni - Coptic calendar - 10 Paoni

Fixed commemorations
All fixed commemorations below are observed on 9 Paoni (16 June) by the Coptic Orthodox Church.

Saints
Departure of Samuel the Prophet
Martyrdom of Saint Lucilianus and his four companions

Commemorations
Relocation of the Relics of Saint Mercurius to Egypt

References
Coptic Synexarion

Days of the Coptic calendar